KMVL may refer to:

 The ICAO code for Morrisville-Stowe State Airport
 KMVL (AM), a radio station (1220 AM) located in Madisonville, Texas, United States
 KMVL-FM, a radio station (100.5 FM) located in Madisonville, Texas, United States